Panzhihua Bao'anying Airport  is an airport serving the city of Panzhihua in China's Sichuan province. The mountaintop airport was opened in December 2003.  Construction of the airport began in 2000 and cost a total of 1.1 billion yuan.  The airport was closed on 25 June 2011 after a major landslide, and was reopened on 29 June 2013 after two years of repair.

Location

Panzhihua, being located in a steep valley of the Jinsha River, does not have a naturally suitable location for an airport. Despite the airport's relative young age, discussions have been ongoing since 2017 on relocating the airport as its current location cannot accommodate further expansion.

Airlines and destinations

As of July 2022, there are 5 airlines flying to 10 destinations from Panzhihua.

See also
List of airports in China
List of the busiest airports in China

References

Airports in Sichuan
Airports established in 2003
2003 establishments in China